Tarsodactylus is an ichnogenus of dinosaur or Crocodylomorph  (such is still a debate)

See also

 List of dinosaur ichnogenera

References

Dinosaur trace fossils